Thomas Joseph Drury DD LHD (January 4, 1908 – July 22, 1992) was an Irish-born prelate of the Roman Catholic Church.  He served as the first bishop of the Diocese of San Angelo in Texas from 1962 to 1965 and as the fourth bishop of the Diocese of Corpus Christi in Texas from 1965 to 1983.

Biography

Early life 
Thomas Drury was born on January 4, 1908, in Ballymote, Ireland.He was ordained a priest by Archbishop Robert Lucey for the Diocese of Amarillo on June 2, 1935, after immigrating to the United States.

Bishop of San Angelo 
Drury was appointed bishop of the Diocese of San Angelo on October 30, 1961, by Pope John XXIII.  He was consecrated by Archbishop Lucey on January 24, 1962.

Bishop of Corpus Christi 
On July 19, 1965, Drury was appointed bishop of the Diocese of Corpus Christi by Pope Paul VI. He served as the bishop during the Second Vatican Council.

Drury expanded diocesan activities from two to thirty-two departments, including Catholic Charities, the Office of Catholic Schools, the Catholic Youth Organization, and the Department of Hispanic Affairs. Drury created a Diocesan Pastoral Council to advise him on current issues in the diocese. He also established a weekly newspaper, Texas Gulf Coast Register, in 1966; it was later known as Texas Gulf Coast Catholic. Today the newspaper is the official diocese newspaper called South Texas Catholic.

Pope Paul II accepted Drury's resignation as bishop of Corpus Christi on May 19, 1983. Thomas Drury died on July 22, 1992 at age 84.

References

External links
Roman Catholic Diocese of Corpus Christi
Roman Catholic Diocese of San Angelo

Episcopal succession

1908 births
1992 deaths
20th-century Roman Catholic bishops in the United States
Irish emigrants to the United States
Participants in the Second Vatican Council
People from Corpus Christi, Texas
Roman Catholic Ecclesiastical Province of Galveston–Houston
Roman Catholic Ecclesiastical Province of San Antonio
Place of death missing
Religious leaders from Texas
Catholics from Texas